The Bulgaria men's national field hockey team represents Bulgaria in international field hockey competitions.

Tournament record
Bulgaria have never qualified for the Summer Olympics, World Cup or the EuroHockey Championship.

European championships

World League

See also
Bulgaria women's national field hockey team

References

European men's national field hockey teams
Field hockey
National team
Men's sport in Bulgaria